Iyer IPS is a 2005 Indian Tamil-language action film written, produced and directed by P. Harirajan. It stars Sathyaraj in a dual role as police officer and a gangster, along with Megha and Sanghavi. The music was composed by Dhina. The film was released on 21 January 2005 to average reviews.

Plot
Iyer, is a Deputy Commissioner of Police who is an encounter specialist. He comes across a Muslim woman named Nasreen, whose father is killed by gangsters. Out of pity, he marries her much against his parents' opposition. While delivering a baby, Sanghavi dies. Meanwhile, Jenniffer, a scribe, learns of a fake encounter organized by Iyer to bump off a known rowdy. She follows him from then, blackmailing him, but Iyer, who thinks that evil forces do not deserve a chance in the court, does not change his style of operations. Elsewhere, a gangster named Venkatachalapathy, who is imprisoned after being apprehended by Iyer, vows to kill him. Now aware that his son kills people in the name of encounters, Iyer's father decides to take cudgels against him. He falls in to the vicious trap of Venkatachalapathy, and the rest is about how Iyer embarks on a mission to rescue his family and put an end to Venkatachalapathy's shenanigans.

Cast

Soundtrack
Soundtrack was composed by Dhina.

Reception
Indiaglitz wrote "Lengthy dialogues and needless stunts make the watching even more tedious." Thiraipadam wrote "With almost no story to speak of, a disjointed screenplay, inane characterization and overacting by almost all the main performers, this one easily wrests the crown [sic] for the most inept movie with a policeman as hero, in recent times." Chennai Online wrote "The weak script, inane charecterisation and the director being totally like a fish out of water in the milieu he's chosen, have all taken their toll on Satyaraj's performance too."

References

2005 films
2000s Tamil-language films
Indian action films
2005 action films